MedNautilus is a submarine telecommunications cable system linking  countries bordering the Eastern/Central Mediterranean Sea. It is a successor of the LEV system linking Cyprus, Israel and Italy.

It has landing points in:

Catania, Sicily, Italy
Chania, Crete, Greece
Koropi (Athens), Greece
Istanbul, Turkey
Tel Aviv, Israel
Haifa, Israel
Pentaskhinos, Cyprus

The system comprises 5,729 km of cable. Its total design transmission capacity is 3.84Tb/s on 6 fiber pairs. All the landing points except those in Turkey and Cyprus are served by a cable ring which ensures uninterrupted service in case any single segment in the ring fails or has its cable severed.

Telecom Italia, which owns the MedNautilus and LEV systems held a virtual monopoly on international cable-based communications to and from Israel. This is changed in 2012 however, with Bezeq International completing a 12.8Tbit/s submarine fiber optic cable to Italy and Tamares Telecom laying a 42Tbit/s submarine fiber optic cable to Cyprus and France.

See also
LEV (cable system)
Bezeq International Optical System (cable system)
List of international submarine communications cables

External links
MedNautilus (official site)

Sources
http://www.mednautilus.com/UserFiles/File/map_big.jpg

Submarine communications cables in the Mediterranean Sea
2001 establishments in Italy
2001 establishments in Greece
2001 establishments in Turkey
2001 establishments in Israel
2001 establishments in Cyprus